Tracy E. Northup (born 1978) is an American physicist who works at the Institute for Experimental Physics, University of Innsbruck. Her research considers the development optical cavities and trapped ions to better quantum mechanical interactions. She was awarded the 2016 Start-Preis of the Austrian Science Fund.

Early life and education 
Northup was born in Newton, Massachusetts. She received an undergraduate degree in physics at Harvard University. She then  moved to the West Coast of the United States and earned her doctoral degree at the California Institute of Technology, where she studied coherent control in cavity quantum electrodynamics under the supervision of H. Jeff Kimble. She then joined Rainer Blatt's group at the University of Innsbruck as an international Marie Curie fellow.

Research and career 
In 2015, Northup was appointed to the faculty of the University of Innsbruck, where she leads the Quantum Interfaces group. In an effort to achieve highly precise control of macroscopic objects, she has explored ways to achieve the nonlinear coupling through the use of a levitating glass sphere, a trapped ion and an optical resonator. The levitating glass sphere is isolated from its environment and is brought into a superposition of states. Northup was awarded the 2016 Start-Preis of the Austrian Science Fund. She is a member of the Erwin Schrödinger Center for Quantum Science & Technology.

In the field of quantum computing, one of the candidate technologies are ion traps. In ion traps charged particles of ultra cold molecules are trapped in electromagnetic field, and manipulated such that they can carry information. However, the quantum mechanical processes that are exploited by ion traps suffer from errors, such as heating up of the molecules themselves. These errors are understood to originate from the weakly conducting materials such as the oxide layers that form on metal surfaces. Northup has developed approaches to evaluate the impact of dielectric materials on the particles within ion traps. In her ion trap systems, Northup can control the distance between the ions and the dielectric optical components. She makes use of the fluctuation-dissipation theorem to calculate the experimental noise.

Selected publications

References

External links 

1978 births
Living people
Academic staff of the University of Innsbruck
California Institute of Technology alumni
Harvard College alumni
American physicists
American women physicists
People from Newton, Massachusetts
21st-century American women